Karen J. Wagner High School is a high school in unincorporated Bexar County, Texas, United States. It is operated by the Judson Independent School District. The school has a San Antonio address but is not within the San Antonio city limits.

The school was named after Lieutenant Colonel Karen J. Wagner, a United States Army officer and a 1979 Judson High School graduate who was killed when an airplane struck the Pentagon on September 11, 2001.

Sports
The school's sports teams are known as the Thunderbirds.

Alumni athletes
 Jordan Clarkson (2010) - Utah Jazz (basketball)
 Derrick Kindred (2012) - San Francisco 49ers (football)
 André Roberson (2010) - Brooklyn Nets (basketball)
 Kiana Williams (2017) - Connecticut Sun (basketball)
 Spencer Burford (2019) - San Francisco 49ers (football)

Fine arts
The Wagner Marching Band won the USSBA TX State Championship three years in a row (2010, 2011, 2012). They won first place at all of their competitions for the 2011-2012 marching season. In 2011, the band went to the B.O.A. San Antonio Super Regional for the first time in its history, and placed 24th out of 72 bands. In 2012, they beat out over 120 bands and were named the Grand National Champion of the USBands Open National Championships, at Meadowlands Stadium in East Rutherford, NJ with a score of 97.52.

In the spring of 2010, the Wagner Color Guard (Crimson Precision) won State Championships (1st place) in the Novice class. They performed to "Glitter In The Air" by Pink.

In the spring of 2007, the Sabre Dancers dance team won first place in every group routine entered, and won Grand Champions on South Padre Island.

Other programs
Other programs include Academic Decathlon (AcaDec), Business Professionals of America (BPA), Gay Straight Alliance (GSA), Theatre Arts, various clubs (Club De Español, French Club, Poetry Club, etc.), Army Junior Reserve Officers' Training Corps (JROTC), and FCCLA.

References

Judson Independent School District high schools
High schools in San Antonio
2005 establishments in Texas
Educational institutions established in 2005